Zahmyre "Zay" Harris (born October 14, 1998) is an American professional soccer player who plays defender for the United States Virgin Islands national soccer team in FIFA and CONCACAF. He played Division One college soccer for Georgia Southern University. He played youth soccer for Georgia United Developmental Academy that has now became Atlanta United.

Personal life
Born in Texas, he relocated to the Atlanta area at the age of 7. His mother is American while his father hails from Saint Croix in the U.S. Virgin Islands.

Career statistics

International

References

External links
 Zahmyre Harris at CaribbeanFootballDatabase

1998 births
Living people
United States Virgin Islands soccer players
United States Virgin Islands international soccer players
Association football midfielders
Soccer players from Atlanta
Soccer players from El Paso, Texas
Georgia Southwestern State Hurricanes men's soccer players